Majlis Wahdat-e-Muslimeen Pakistan (MWM) is a Pakistani Shi'a political organization. Its headquarters are in Islamabad. MWM Pakistan works to establish an Islamic democratic welfare state, particularly emphasising Shi'a-Sunni unity.

History and Perspective

History
Majlis Wahdat-e-Muslimeen was founded by a group of Shiite Muslim clergy and former members of the largest Shiite students' organization Imamia Students Organization on August 2, 2009 in Islamabad, Pakistan. It is popular among Shiite Muslims in the Punjab, Sindh, Khyber Pukhtunkhwa, Baluchistan, Gilgit-Baltistan and in Azad Kashmir.

Perspective
The party's main perspective is to speak against the oppression of Pakistan's Shia community, establish goodwill with the Sunni Muslim community, raise political and religious awareness among Muslims and to revive the teachings of the Quran and Muhammad in the society.

Elections
In an interview with The Express Tribune, MWM Karachi's political secretary, Syed Asghar Abbas Zaidi, said that the party’s aims were to gain seats and to install an Islamic regime. The Election Commission of Pakistan designated the MWM as a political organization in 2013. The election commission allotted Majlis Wahdat-e-Muslimeen the tent as an electoral symbol. MWM announced in March 2013 that in the 2013 general elections, it would field more than 50 candidates on provincial seats and 20 on national seats, including 10 provincial slots and 11 national seats from Karachi.

Ties and Muslim unity 

Majlis Wahdat-e-Muslimeen supported Pakistan Tehreek-e-Insaf in the general elections and is the first religio-political organization supported by Imran Khan and his party.

Sunni-based Sunni Tehreek, Pakistan Awami Tehreek, Sunni Ittehad Council and Jamiat Ulema-e-Pakistan are supporters of Shiite-based Majlis Wahdat-e-Muslimeen. All of them are on one platform running against Pakistani Taliban and its sub-groups Sipah-e-Sahaba and Lashkar-e-Jhangvi.

Majlis Wahdat-e-Muslimeen and Sunni Ittehad Council held many gatherings across Pakistan to promote unity. Minorities including Christians and Hindus were invited to these gatherings. MWM says that they believe that unity is the only way out of sectarian tensions among the Muslims.

PAT President Dr Raheeq Abbasi expressed gratitude to the MWM leadership for its support to Tahir-ul-Qadri’s revolutionary struggle. He said that he welcomed MWM head's Allama Raja Nasir Abbas decision. He said that this support of MWM would continue through the revolution, adding that MWM would play an effective role in the struggle of changing the destiny of 180 million Pakistanis. He said that MWM leadership’s decision to support revolution was for the sake of progress, stability and solidarity.

Terrorist attacks 
On April 28, 2013, Hassan Kashmiri, MWM activist and a resident of Rizvia Society was gunned down by unidentified gunmen. Following his funeral, the mourning procession took his body to Wadi-e-Hussain graveyard. According to the Senior Superintendent of the Police, Imran Shoukat, as the procession was passing through the Liaquatabad area, some participants opened fired, killing two people. The MWM condemned the attack and denied that the participants had opened fire. The banned Sipah-e-Sahaba is blamed for the attack.

While police were busy with Kashmiri's case, an attack on a Shiite scholar near Liaquatabad No.10 left him injured and his police bodyguard dead. The Senior Superintendent of the Police, Amir Farooqi said that Syed Baqar Hussain Zaidi was heading towards Rizvia Society when four men on motorcycles opened fire.

On 22 August 2014, Mazhar Haider and his younger brother Irfan Haider sustained bullet wounds. They were rushed to hospital where doctors pronounced Irfan's death and admitted Mazhar with critical wounds. MWM spokesman said Mazhar was the MWM president of central district. It was a targeted attack conducted by Sipah-e-Sahaba.

Protest 
In 2013, MWM announced Dharna all over Pakistan after the martyrdom of the momeneen. As the result of this process, whole country was sealed down even the trains and flights were canceled. So the federal government was forced to accept the demands of Shia Muslims.

A hunger strike by MWM chief commenced in May 2016, while camped in front of National Press Club Islamabad. It organized protests through banners, placards and demonstration led by religious leaders at almost all big cities of Pakistan on Friday 22 July 2016. MWM staged a sit-in at Numaish Chowrangi, Karachi and on The Mall outside the Punjab Assembly on same day.

See also
 Shia Ulema Council
 Tehrik-e-Jafaria
 Imamia Students Organization
 Sipah-e-Muhammad Pakistan

References

External links

2009 establishments in Pakistan
Islamic political parties in Pakistan
Islamic socialist political parties
Political parties established in 2009